The McCord Stewart Museum is a public research and teaching museum dedicated to the preservation, study, diffusion, and appreciation of Canadian history. The museum, whose full name is McCord Museum of Canadian History, is located next to McGill University, in the downtown core of Montreal, Quebec, Canada.

History

On October 13, 1921, the McCord National Museum, as it was then called, moved to the former McGill Union building, designed by Percy Erskine Nobbs in the Arts and Crafts tradition. The collection was based on the McCord family collection. Since 1878, David Ross McCord had been adding to the already considerable collection assembled by his family since their arrival in Canada. Over the years, he developed the plan of founding a national history museum in Montreal, at that time Canada's metropolis.

The building that now houses the museum was administered by McGill University for over sixty years, when it was the seat of the student government. After riots targeted at SSMU led to the building's storming and several executives being taken hostage, McGill University set out to build a more secure building, University Centre, the current seat of SSMU. Leading members of the community lent their support to the museum over the years. Today, the McCord Museum is supported by the governments of Canada, Quebec and Montreal, and by a large network of members, donors and sponsors.

Collection
The museum was founded in 1921 by David Ross McCord, based on his own family collection of objects. Since then, the museum's holdings have increased substantially.

Ethnology and Archaeology
This collection of 15,800 objects documents many aspects of the ways of life, arts, cultures and traditions of the Aboriginal Canadians. It also includes a number of objects from communities living in Alaska and the northern United States.

In this collection, there are more than 7,300 historical aboriginal objects, dating from the early 1800s to 1945 (clothing, accessories, headgear, domestic tools, baskets, hunting weaponry, etc.) and more than 8,500 archaeological objects dating from about 10,000 years ago to the 16th century (stone tools, potsherds).

Costume and Textiles
This collection of 18,845 objects consists of women's dresses, parasols, hats, fans and footwear, many created by some of Montreal's greatest 20th century designers. The menswear in the collection includes suits, coats and accessories. There is also an important selection of embroidered samplers, quilts and other textiles, including North America's oldest known patchwork quilt (1726).

Notman Photographic Archives

This collection includes 1,300,000 photographs and various items of early photographic equipment and accessories. It provides a visual history of Montreal and Canada from the 1840s to the present.

The collection contains the William Notman & Son Photographic Studio fond constituting more than 600,000 photographic images (including 200,000 glass negatives) dating mostly from 1840 to 1935. The collection also includes approximately 700,000 images taken by other photographers.

Paintings, Prints and Drawings
This collection of 69,000 iconographical pieces illustrates the personalities, places and events that made the history of Montreal, Quebec and Canada, from the 18th to the 21st centuries.

It includes paintings (oils, acrylics and watercolours, mostly from the 19th century), miniatures, silhouettes, prints (maps, plans, portraits, mostly from 1751 to 1900) and caricatures from the 19th, 20th and 21st centuries (John Collins, Serge Chapleau and Terry Mosher alias Aislin).

Decorative Arts
The 38,900 objects included in this collection documents the material environment within which Montrealers, Quebeckers and Canadians lived in past centuries.

This collection consists of furniture, glassware, ceramics, ironware, sculpture, hunting equipment, sports equipment, items of folk art and a major collection of 19th century toys.

Textual Archives
This collection, which total 262 running meters, includes manuscripts, correspondence, personal journals and other documents showing the history of Canada from the 18th century to the present.

The documents come from families (the Dessaulles, McCord, Armstrong-Deligny-Philips and Bacon families); from well-known individuals (Sir George-Étienne Cartier, Maurice-Régis Blondeau, Hélène Baillargeon Côté); from companies and associations (Women's Art Society of Montreal, Victoria Rifles of Canada, Gibb & Co.); and from collections (New France, British Empire, Concert and Theatre Programs, Valentines).

The museum's exterior features the sculpture Totem urbain / histoire en dentelle, an allegorical representation of Montreal history, by Pierre Granche.

Affiliations
The museum is affiliated with the CMA, CHIN, and Virtual Museum of Canada.

References

Bibliography

External links

 McCord Stewart Museum

1921 establishments in Quebec
Museums established in 1921
History museums in Quebec
Museums in Montreal
Biographical museums in Canada
Percy Erskine Nobbs buildings
McGill University
Downtown Montreal